Jericho is the seventh studio album by Canadian rock band Prism. It was originally released in 1993. Most of the tracks were recorded in 1993, however the songs "Good to Be Back" and "Way of the World" were recorded and released as a single in 1988 after the group reformed. The album was recorded and mixed at "Mushroom Studios" in Vancouver, except for tracks #2 and #3 which were recorded by Jim Vallance at "Distorto Studios" in Vancouver.

Composition 
The songs "(Who Put Those) Things In Your Head", "Lonely Town" and "Out of My Head" were written by Al Harlow and recorded in 1978 for the See Forever Eyes sessions and were originally sung by former singer, the late Ron Tabak, however they were never released on an album until 15 years later.
The songs "Good To Be Back" and "Way of World" were co-written by Al Harlow, Jim Vallance and Bryan Adams in 1988 after Prism reformed. "Good To Be Back" was released as a single in 1988.

Track listing 
All songs written by Al Harlow unless otherwise noted.

 "Speed of Light" – 4:37
 "Good to Be Back" (A. Harlow, Jim Vallance, Bryan Adams) – 3:09
 "Way of the World" – 3:42
 "Stand Up for Love" (J. Vallance, Rick Springfield)- 4:34
 "Trouble" (Lindsay Mitchell) – 5:06
 "Jericho" (J. Vallance, L. Mitchell)– 2:32
 "Out of My Head" – 4:32
 "(I'm Only) Half a Man"(A. Harlow, J. Parkes) – 3:56
 "(Who Put Those) Things in Your Head" – 4:14
 "Lonely Town" – 3:15
 "Bad News (Travels Fast)" (Randy Bachman) – 4:05
 "Faces on a Train" (L. Mitchell) – 5:54

Personnel 

Prism
 Lindsay Mitchell –  lead guitar, electric 12-string & acoustic guitars, talker guitar, backing vocals
 Darcy Deutsch – lead vocals
 Andy Lorimer – keyboards, backing vocals
 Al Harlow – bass, electric 12-string, 6-string, bow, backwards & slide guitars, backing vocals
 Rocket Norton – drums

Guest musicians
 John Cody
 Dave Steele
 Jim Vallance
 Bryan Adams
 Jamie Meyer
 Paul Janz
 Marc Lafrance

Production
 Rolf Henneman
 Pete Wonsiak – 2nd engineer
 Keith Stein
 Jim Vallance
 Craig Waddell
 Ralph Alfonso – photography and design

1993 albums
Prism (band) albums